Headlights is an album by The Whispers released in 1978 on the SOLAR Records label.  This album charted at number 22 on the Billboard Soul Albums chart.

Track listing

Credits 

 A&r [Coordination] – Marge Meoli
 Arranged By [Horn & String] – Tom Tom 84 (tracks: A1 to A4, B2, B3)
 Arranged By [Rhythm] – Gene Page (tracks: A2, A4, B3, B4)
 Design [Album] – Tim Bryant (2)
 Engineer – Steve Hodge
 Mastered By – Wally Traugott
 Photography By – Ron Slenzak
 Producer – Dick Griffey

Charts

Singles

References

External links
 

1978 albums
The Whispers albums
SOLAR Records albums